This is an alphabetical list of fungal taxa as recorded from South Africa. Currently accepted names have been appended.

Ga
Genus: Galera (Fr.) P. Kumm. 1871
Galera eatoni (Berk.) Sacc
Galera hypnorum (Batsch) Quél. 1872
Galera lateritia Quel. (sic) possibly (Fr.) P. Kumm. 1871
Galera peroxydata (Berk.) Sacc. 1887, accepted as Conocybe peroxydata (Berk.) D.A. Reid, (1975)
Galera pygmaeo-affinis (Fr.) Quél. 1872, accepted as Conocybe pygmaeoaffinis (Fr.) Kühner, (1935)
Galera spartea Quel. (sic) possibly (Fr.) P. Kumm. 1871, accepted as Conocybe spartea (Fr.) Konrad & Maubl., (1949) [1948]
Galera sphagnorum Karst. (sic) possibly (Pers.) Sacc. 1887, accepted as Galerina sphagnorum (Pers.) Kühner, (1935)
Galera tenera Quel. (sic) possibly (Schaeff.) P. Kumm. 187,1 accepted as Conocybe tenera (Schaeff.) Kühner, (1935)
Galera tenera var. siliginea Quel. (sic) possibly (Fr.) P. Kumm. 1871, accepted as Conocybe siliginea (Fr.) Kühner, (1935)

Genus: Ganoderma P. Karst. 1881
Ganoderma africanum (Lloyd) Doidge 1950
Ganoderma alluaudi Pat. & Har. 1906
Ganoderma applanatum (Pers.) Pat. 1887
Ganoderma applanatum var. laccatum (Sacc.) Rea 1922 accepted as Ganoderma pfeifferi Bres.,  (1889)
Ganoderma australe (Fr.) Pat. 1889
Ganoderma chilense (Fr.) Pat. 1889
Ganoderma colossus Bres.(sic) [as colossum] possibly (Fr.) C.F. Baker 1920
Ganoderma curtisii (Berk.) Murrill 1908
Ganoderma emini Henn. 1893 accepted as Humphreya eminii (Henn.) Ryvarden, (1980)
Ganoderma fulvellum Bres. 1889 accepted as Fomes fulvellus (Bres.) Sacc., (1891)
Ganoderma lobatum Atk. (sic) possibly Bres. 1889, accepted as Fomes fulvellus (Bres.) Sacc., (1891)
Ganoderma lucidum (Curtis) P. Karst. 1881
Ganoderma mastoporum (Lév.) Pat. 1889 accepted as Ganoderma orbiforme (Fr.) Ryvarden [as orbiformum], (2000)
Ganoderma mollicarnosum (Lloyd) Sacc. & Trotter 1925 accepted as Navisporus floccosus (Bres.) Ryvarden [as floccosa], (1980)
Ganoderma obockense Pat. (1887) [as obockense]
Ganoderma oerstedii Bres. (sic) possibly (Fr.) Torrend 1902
Ganoderma oroflavum (Lloyd) C.J. Humphrey 1931 accepted as Ganoderma australe (Fr.) Pat., (1889)
Ganoderma resinaceum Boud. 1889
Ganoderma rugosum Bres. (sic) possibly (Blume & T. Nees) Pat. 1889, or Ganoderma rugosum var. nigrozonatum Bres. 1915, both accepted as Sanguinoderma rugosum (Blume & T. Nees) Y.F. Sun, D.H. Costa & B.K. Cui, (2020)

Genus: Gassicurtia Fée 1825
Gassicurtia silacea Fée 1834 [as Gassicourtia silicea] accepted as Coniothecium silaceum (Fée) Keissl., (1930) 

Family: Gasteromyceteae*

Ge
Genus: Geaster P. Micheli 1729 accepted as Geastrum Pers., (1794)
Geaster affinis Colenso. accepted as Geastrum affine Colenso (1884) [1883]
Geaster calceus Lloyd. accepted as Geastrum calceum Lloyd (1907)
Geaster capensis Thuem. accepted as Geastrum capense Thüm. (1877)
Geaster coliformis Dicks. acceped as Geastrum coliforme (Dicks.) Pers. (1801)
Geaster coriaceus Colenso. accepted as Geastrum coriaceum Colenso (1890) [1889]
Geaster coronatus Schroet. accepted as Geastrum coronatum Schaeff. ex J. Schröt. (1889)
Geaster drummondii Berk. accepted as Geastrum drummondii Berk. 1845
Geaster fenestratum Fisch. (sic) probably accepted as Geastrum fenestratum (Batsch) Lloyd 1901
Geaster granulosus Fuck. accepted as Geastrum granulosum Fuckel 1860
Geaster macowani Kalchbr. accepted as Geastrum macowanii Kalchbr. 1882
Geaster minimus Fisch.*
Geaster plicatus Berk.*
Geaster schmidelii Vit. accepted as Geastrum schmidelii Vittad. 1842
Geaster schweinfurthii P.Henn. accepted as Geastrum schweinfurthii Henn. 1891
Geaster striatulus Kalchbr. accepted as Geastrum striatulum Kalchbr. 1880

Genus: Geasteropsis Hollós 1903 accepted as Geastrum Pers., (1794)
Geasteropsis conrathii Hollós 1903 [as conrathi] accepted as Geastrum conrathii (Hollós) P. Ponce de León, (1968)

Family: Geastreae

Genus: Geastrum Pers. 1794
Geastrum ambiguum Mont. 1837
Geastrum arenarium Lloyd 1907
Geastrum bryantii Berk. 1860 accepted as Geastrum striatum DC. [as Geaster], (1805)
Geastrum campestre Morgan 1887
Geastrum conrathii (Hollós) P. Ponce de León, (1968) recorded as Geasteropsis conrathii Hollós 1903 [as conrathi]
Geastrum corollinum (Batsch) Hollós, (1904) reported as Geastrum mammosum Chevall. 1826 
Geastrum dissimile Bottomley 1948.
Geastrum fimbriatum Fr. 1829
Geastrum floriforme Vittad. 1842
Geastrum fornicatum Fr. (sic) possibly (Huds.) Hook. 1821
Geastrum hieronymi Henn. 1897
Geastrum hygrometricum Pers. 1801 accepted as Astraeus hygrometricus (Pers.) Morgan, (1889)
Geastrum limbatum Fr. 1829
Geastrum limbatum var. ellipsostoma N.J.G.*
Geastrum macowani Kalchbr. 1882.
Geastrum mammosum Chevall. 1826 accepted as Geastrum corollinum (Batsch) Hollós, (1904)
Geastrum minimum Schwein. 1822
Geastrum mirabile Mont. 1855
Geastrum nanum Pers. 1809 accepted as Geastrum striatum DC. [as Geaster], (1805)
Geastrum pazschkeanum Henn. 1900
Geastrum pectinatum Pers. 1801
Geastrum quadrifidum Pers. 1794
Geastrum saccatum Fr. 1829
Geastrum triplex Jungh. 1840
Geastrum velutinum Morgan 1895

Family: Geoglossaceae Corda 1838

Genus: Geopyxis (Pers.) Sacc. 1889
Geopyxis aluticolor (Berk.) Sacc. 1889
Geopyxis ammophila Dur. & Mont. (sic) possibly Sacc. 1889, accepted as Peziza ammophila Durieu & Lév., (1848)
Geopyxis cupularis (L.) Sacc. 1889 accepted as Tarzetta cupularis (L.) Lambotte, (1887)

Genus: Geotrichum Link 1809
Geotrichum rugosum (Castell.) C.W. Dodge 1935
Geotrichum sp.

Gi
Genus: Gibellula Cavara 1894
Gibellula aranearum P. Syd. 1922
Gibellula haygarthii Van der Byl 1922

Genus: Gibbera Fr. 1825
Gibbera engleriana (Henn.) Van der Byl 1928
Gibbera tinctoria Massee 1911

Genus: Gibberella Sacc. 1877 accepted as Fusarium Link, (1809)
Gibberella acuminata Wollenw. 1943 accepted as Fusarium acuminatum Ellis & Everh., (1895)
Gibberella baccata (Wallr.) Sacc. 1878, accepted as Fusarium lateritium Nees, (1816)
Gibberella fujikuroi Wollenw. (sic) possibly (Sawada) S. Ito 1919 accepted as Fusarium fujikuroi Nirenberg, (1976)
Gibberella fujikuroi var. subglutinans E.T. Edwards 1933 accepted as Fusarium fujikuroi Nirenberg, (1976)
Gibberella intricans Wollenw. 1930 accepted as Fusarium gibbosum Appel & Wollenw., (1910)
Gibberella pulicaris (Kunze) Sacc. 1877 accepted as Fusarium roseum Link, (1809)
Gibberella saubinetii (Mont.) Sacc. 1879 accepted as Fusarium graminearum Schwabe, (1839)

Gl
Genus: Gliocladium Corda 1840, accepted as Sphaerostilbella (Henn.) Sacc. & D. Sacc., (1905)
Gliocladium deliquescens Sopp 1912 accepted as Trichoderma deliquescens (Sopp) Jaklitsch, (2011)
Gliocladium penicillioides Corda 1840 [as penicilloides] accepted as Sphaerostilbella penicillioides (Corda) Rossman, L. Lombard & Crous, (2015)
Gliocladium roseum Bainier 1907 accepted as Clonostachys rosea (Link) Schroers, Samuels, Seifert & W. Gams, (1999)

Genus: Gloeodes Colby 1920
Gloeodes pomigena (Schwein.) Colby 1920

Genus: Gloeoporus Mont. 1842
Gloeoporus conchoides Mont. 1842 accepted as Gloeoporus thelephoroides (Hook.) G. Cunn., (1965)
Gloeoporus dichrous (Fr.) Bres. 1912 accepted as Vitreoporus dichrous (Fr.) Zmitr., (2018)
Gloeoporus thelephoroides (Hook.) G. Cunn., (1965) reported as Gloeoporus conchoides Mont. 1842

Genus: Gloeosoma Bres. 1920, accepted as Aleurodiscus Rabenh. ex J. Schröt., (1888)
Gloeosoma capensis (Lloyd) Lloyd 1920, accepted as Aleurocystis capensis (Lloyd) Lloyd, (1920)

Genus: Gloeosporium Desm. & Mont. 1849, accepted as Diplocarpon F.A. Wolf, (1912)
Gloeosporium affineSacc. 1878
Gloeosporium ampelophagum de Bary (sic) possibly (Pass.) Sacc. 1878, accepted as Elsinoe ampelina Shear, (1929)
Gloeosporium amygdalinum Brizi (sic) possibly (Pass.) Sacc. 1878, accepted as Elsinoe ampelina Shear, (1929)
Gloeosporium cocophilum  Wakef. 1913 accepted as Colletotrichum gloeosporioides (Penz.) Penz. & Sacc., (1884)
Gloeosporium crocatum Sacc. 1891
Gloeosporium epicarpi Thüm. 1877
Gloeosporium fructigenum Berk. 1856 accepted as Colletotrichum gloeosporioides (Penz.) Penz. & Sacc.,  (1884)
Gloeosporium cydoniae  Mont. 1851
Gloeosporium helichrysi G. Winter 1885 accepted as Colletotrichum helichrysi (G. Winter) Arx, (1957)
Gloeosporium lagenaria (Pass.) Sacc. & Roum. [as lagenarium], (1880) accepted as Gloeosporium orbiculare (Berk.) Berk., (1876)
Gloeosporium limetticola R.E. Clausen 1912, [as 'limetticolum'] accepted as Colletotrichum limetticola (R.E. Clausen) Damm, P.F. Cannon & Crous [as 'limetticolum'], (2012)
Gloeosporium mangiferae Henn. 1898 accepted as Colletotrichum coccodes (Wallr.) S. Hughes, (1958)
Gloeosporium musarum Cooke & Massee 1887
Gloeosporium myricae Dippen. 1931
Gloeosporium olivarum J.V. Almeida 1899 accepted as Colletotrichum coccodes (Wallr.) S. Hughes, (1958)
Gloeosporium papayae Henn. 1895
Gloeosporium passiflorae Speg. 1898 accepted as Colletotrichum coccodes (Wallr.) S. Hughes, (1958)
Gloeosporium psidii Delacr. 1903 accepted as Colletotrichum coccodes (Wallr.) S. Hughes, (1958)
Gloeosporium ptychospermatis Henn. 1902 accepted as Phlyctema ptychospermatis (Henn.) Arx, (1957)
Gloeosporium sansevieriae Verwoerd & du Plessis 1931
Gloeosporium sclerocaryae Pole Evans*
Gloeosporium venetum Speg. 1879
Gloeosporium violae Berk. & Br. (sic) possibly Pass. 1849, accepted as Marssonina violae (Pass.) Magnus, (1906)
Gloeosporium sp.

Genus: Glomerella Spauld. & H. Schrenk 1903, accepted as Colletotrichum Corda, (1831)
Glomerella cingulata (G.F. Atk.) Spauld. & H. Schrenk 1903 accepted as Colletotrichum gloeosporioides (Penz.) Penz. & Sacc., (1884)
Glomerella glycines Lehman & F.A. Wolf 1926 accepted as Colletotrichum glycines Hori ex Hemmi, (1920)
Glomerella gossypii Edgerton 1909 accepted as Colletotrichum gossypii Southw.,  (1891)
Glomerella lindemuthiana Shear [as lindemuthianum], Bull. (1913) accepted as Colletotrichum lindemuthianum (Sacc. & Magnus) Briosi & Cavara 1889
Glomerella phacidiomorpha (Ces.) Petr. 1927
Glomerella psidii J. Sheld. 1905
Glomerella rufomaculans (Berk.) Spauld. & H. Schrenk 1903 accepted as Colletotrichum gloeosporioides (Penz.) Penz. & Sacc., (1884)

Genus: Gloniella Sacc. 1883
Gloniella multiseptata Doidge 1920 accepted as Gloniella natalensis Doidge, (1941)
Gloniella natalensis Doidge, 1941

Genus: Glyphis Ach. 1814 (Lichens)
Glyphis cicatricosa Ach. 1814
Glyphis cicatricosa var. confluens (Zenker) Zahlbr. 1927 accepted as Glyphis cicatricosa Ach. 1814
Glyphis cicatricosa var. simplicior (Vain.) Zahlbr. 1927
Glyphis confluens Zenker 1827 accepted as Glyphis cicatricosa Ach. 1814

Gn
Genus: Gnomonia Ces. & De Not. 1863
Gnomonia leptostyla (Fr.) Ces. & De Not. 1863

Family: Gnomoniaceae G. Winter 1886

Go
Genus: Gomphinaria Preuss 1851, accepted as Ramularia Unger, (1833)
Gomphinaria pedrosoi (Brumpt) C.W. Dodge 1935 accepted as Fonsecaea pedrosoi (Brumpt) Negroni, (1936)

Genus: Gorgoniceps (P. Karst.) P. Karst. 1871
Gorgoniceps kuitoensis Henn. 1903

Gr
Genus: Grammothele Berk. & M.A. Curtis 1868
Grammothele mappa Berk. & M.A. Curtis 1868 accepted as Grammothele lineata Berk. & M.A. Curtis, (1868)

Genus: Grandinia Fr. 1838 accepted as Hyphodontia J. Erikss., (1958)
Grandinia bicolor P.H.B. Talbot 1948 accepted as Dendrodontia bicolor (P.H.B. Talbot) Hjortstam & Ryvarden, (1980)
Grandinia rosea Henn. 1905 accepted as Roseograndinia rosea (Henn.) Hjortstam & Ryvarden, (2005)

Genus: Graphina Müll. Arg. 1880
Graphina acharii (Fée) Müll. Arg. 1887 accepted as Allographa acharii (Fée) Lücking & Kalb, (2018)
Graphina analoga (Nyl.) Zahlbr. 1927
Graphina atrofusca Müll. Arg. 1887 acceped as Glyphis atrofusca (Müll. Arg.) Lücking, (2009)
Graphina bylii (Vain.) Zahlbr. 1932
Graphina bylii var. lividula (Vain.) Zahlbr. 1932
Graphina obtrita (Fée) Müll. Arg. 1887
Graphina pergracilis Zahlbr. 1932
Graphina platycarpa (Eschw.) Zahlbr. 1902
Graphina polycarpa Müll. Arg. 1887
Graphina sophistica  (Nyl.) Müll. Arg. 1880

Family: Graphiolaceae Clem. & Shear 1931

Genus: Graphiola Poit. 1824
Graphiola phoenicis (Moug. ex Fr.) Poit. 1824

Family: Graphidaceae Dumort. 1822 (Lichens)

Genus: Graphis Adans. 1763 (Lichens)
Graphis acharii Fée 1825 accepted as Allographa acharii (Fée) Lücking & Kalb, (2018)
Graphis analoga Nyl. 1859
Graphis analoga f. tetraspora Stizenb.*
Graphis atrofusca (Müll. Arg.) Stizenb. 1891
Graphis bylii Vain. 1926
Graphis bylii var. lividula Vain. 1926
Graphis caesiopruinosa (Fée) Kremp. 1875 accepted as Phaeographina caesiopruinosa (Fée) Müll. Arg., (1887)
Graphis cicatricosa (Ach.) Vain. 1890 accepted as Glyphis cicatricosa Ach., (1814)
Graphis cicatricosa var. confluens (Zenker) Vain. 1890 accepted as Glyphis cicatricosa Ach., (1814)
Graphis cicatricosa var. simplicior Vain. 1890
Graphis denudans  Vain. 1926
Graphis devestiens Nyl. 1891
Graphis diaphoroides Müll. Arg. 1886
Graphis intertexta Nyl. (sic) possibly Müll. Arg. 1895
Graphis intricata Fée 1825
Graphis inusta var. emergens Vain. ex Van der Byl 1931
Graphis mesographa Nyl. 1863
Graphis polycarpa (Müll. Arg.) Stizenb. 1891
Graphis scripta (L.) Ach. 1809
Graphis sophistica Nyl. 1863
Graphis striatula (Ach.) Spreng. 1827 accepted as Allographa striatula (Ach.) Lücking & Kalb, (2018)
Graphis subfarinacea Nyl. 1891
Graphis subolivacea Zahlbr. 1926

Gu
Genus: Guepinia Fr. 1825
Guepinia agariciformis Lloyd 1923 accepted as Dacryopinax spathularia (Schwein.) G.W. Martin, (1948)
Guepinia fissa Berk. 1843
Guepinia flabellata Cooke 1884 accepted as Inflatostereum glabrum (Pat.) D.A. Reid, (1965)
Guepinia palmiceps Berk. 1843
Guepinia petaloides Kalchbr. 1882
Guepinia sparassoides Kalchbr. 1882
Guepinia spathularia (Schwein.) Fr. 1828 accepted as Dacryopinax spathularia (Schwein.) G.W. Martin, (1948)
Guepinia spathularia f. lata Lloyd.*

Genus: Guignardia Viala & Ravaz 1892, accepted as Phyllosticta Pers., (1818)
Guignardia bidwellii (Ellis) Viala & Ravaz 1892 accepted as Phyllosticta ampelicida (Engelm.) Aa,  (1973)

Gy
Genus: Gyalecta Ach. 1808
Gyalecta thunbergiana Ach. 1810 accepted as Diploschistes thunbergianus (Ach.) Lumbsch & Vězda,  (1993)

Family: Gyalectaceae Stizenb. 1862

Order: Gymnoascales G. Winter 1884

Family: Gymnoascaceae Imperfectae

Family: Gymnocarpeae

Genus: Gymnoglossum Massee 1891
Gymnoglossum radiatum (Lloyd) Bottomley 1948 accepted as Aroramyces radiatus (Lloyd) Castellano, Verbeken & Walleyn, (2000)

Genus: Gyrodon Opat. 1836
Gyrodon capensis Sacc. 1896

Family: Gyrophoraceae Zenker 1827

Genus: Gyrophragmium Mont. 1843
Gyrophragmium delilei Mont. 1843
Gyrophragmium inquinans (Berk.) Lloyd 1904

Genus: Gyrostomum Fr. 1825, accepted as Glyphis Ach., (1814) (Lichens)
Gyrostomum scyphuliferum (Ach.) Nyl. 1862 accepted as Glyphis scyphulifera (Ach.) Staiger, (2002)

See also
 List of bacteria of South Africa
 List of Oomycetes of South Africa
 List of slime moulds of South Africa

 List of fungi of South Africa
 List of fungi of South Africa – A
 List of fungi of South Africa – B
 List of fungi of South Africa – C
 List of fungi of South Africa – D
 List of fungi of South Africa – E
 List of fungi of South Africa – F
 List of fungi of South Africa – G
 List of fungi of South Africa – H
 List of fungi of South Africa – I
 List of fungi of South Africa – J
 List of fungi of South Africa – K
 List of fungi of South Africa – L
 List of fungi of South Africa – M
 List of fungi of South Africa – N
 List of fungi of South Africa – O
 List of fungi of South Africa – P
 List of fungi of South Africa – Q
 List of fungi of South Africa – R
 List of fungi of South Africa – S
 List of fungi of South Africa – T
 List of fungi of South Africa – U
 List of fungi of South Africa – V
 List of fungi of South Africa – W
 List of fungi of South Africa – X
 List of fungi of South Africa – Y
 List of fungi of South Africa – Z

References

Sources

Further reading
 

Fungi
South African biodiversity lists
South Africa